Anastasia Stashkevich (born 20 November 1984) is a Russian principal dancer with the Bolshoi Ballet.

Anastasia Stashkevich was born in St. Petersburg, and studied at the Moscow Choreographic Academy with Tatyana Galtseva. Upon her graduation in 2003 she joined the Bolshoi Ballet, where she presently works under the tutelage of Svetlana Adyrkhaeva. She was promoted to the rank of soloist in October 2009, to first soloist in September 2011, to leading soloist in May 2012, and was appointed to the rank of principal dancer in July 2015.

Her guest appearances have included performing Kitri in Don Quixote with the Tokyo Ballet and Phrygia in Spartacus with the Royal Ballet of Flanders.

In 2018 Stashkevich received the Golden Mask theater award for her performance as the Novice in Jerome Robbins' The Cage.

Repertoire
La Sylphide (choreography: Johan Kobborg, after August Bournonville): Sylph, pas de six
Giselle (choreography: Yuri Grigorovich, after Jean Coralli and Jules Perrot): Giselle, peasant pas de deux
Giselle (choreography: Vladimir Vasiliev, after Jean Coralli and Jules Perrot): Giselle, pas d'action
Coppélia (choreography: Sergei Vikharev, after Marius Petipa and Enrico Cecchetti): Swanilda, Dawn
Swan Lake (choreography: Yuri Grigorovich, after Marius Petipa and Lev Ivanov): pas de trois, Neapolitan Bride
The Sleeping Beauty (choreography: Yuri Grigorovich, after Marius Petipa): Canary, Princess Florine, Diamond Fairy, Red Riding Hood
Raymonda (choreography: Yuri Grigorovich, after Marius Petipa): grand pas variation
La Bayadère (choreography: Yuri Grigorovich, after Marius Petipa): first variation in the "Kingdom of the Shades"
Don Quixote (choreography: Alexei Fadeyechev, after Marius Petipa and Alexander Gorsky): Kitri, Amour
Don Quixote (choreography: Vladimir Vasiliev, after Marius Petipa and Alexander Gorsky): Kitri
Le Corsaire (choreography: Yuri Burlaka and Alexei Ratmansky, after Marius Petipa): Gulnare, pas d'esclaves
Esmeralda (choreography: Yuri Burlaka and Vasily Medvedev, after Marius Petipa): Esmeralda, Diana
Paquita, grand pas (choreography: Yuri Burlaka, after Marius Petipa): solo variation, pas de trois
La Fille mal gardée (choreography by Frederick Ashton): Lise
Marco Spada (choreography: Pierre Lacotte): Angela, Bride
The Pharaoh's Daughter (choreography: Pierre Lacotte): Ramzé, Fisherman's Wife, Guadalquivir
The Nutcracker (choreography: Yuri Grigorovich): Marie
Legend of Love (choreography: Yuri Grigorovich): Shirin
Spartacus (choreography: Yuri Grigorovich): Phrygia
Anyuta (choreography: Vladimir Vasiliev): Anyuta
Cipollino (choreography: Genrikh Mayorov): Little Radish
Onegin (choreography: John Cranko): Olga
The Lady of the Camellias (choreography: John Neumeier): Olympia
Anna Karenina (choreography: John Neumeier): Dolly (first interpreter at the Bolshoi)
The Bright Stream (choreography: Alexei Ratmansky): Zina, Galya
Flames of Paris (choreography: Alexei Ratmansky, after Vasily Vainonen): Adeline, Amour
Lost Illusions (choreography: Alexei Ratmansky): Coralie
Romeo and Juliet (choreography: Alexei Ratmansky): Juliet
The Taming of the Shrew (choreography: Jean-Christophe Maillot): Bianca
Hamlet (choreography: Radu Poklitaru): Ophelia (first interpreter)
A Hero of Our Time (choreography: Yuri Possokhov): Mary, in "Princess Mary"
Nureyev (choreography: Yuri Possokhov): Ballerina (first interpreter)
Moydodyr (choreography: Yuri Smekalov): Fresh-as-a-Daisy
Chopiniana (choreography: Michel Fokine): 11th Waltz 
Petrushka (choreography: Michel Fokine): Ballerina
Apollo (choreography: George Balanchine): Calliope
Glinka Pas de Trois (choreography: George Balanchine)
Jewels (choreography: George Balanchine): Emeralds, Rubies
The Cage (choreography: Jerome Robbins): Novice (first interpreter at the Bolshoi)
L'Arlésienne (choreography: Roland Petit): Vivette
In the Upper Room (choreography: Twyla Tharp)
Jeu de cartes (choreography: Alexei Ratmansky)
Russian Seasons (choreography: Alexei Ratmansky): Couple in Yellow, Couple in Claret
Classical Symphony (choreography: Yuri Possokhov)
Cinque (choreography: Mauro Bigonzetti)
Dream of Dream (choreography: Jorma Elo; world premiere)
Chroma (choreography: Wayne McGregor)

Filmography
Don Quixote (choreography: Alexei Fadeyechev), Bolshoi Ballet, 2011: as Amour
Coppélia (choreography: Sergei Vikharev), Bolshoi Ballet, 2011: as Dawn
Esmeralda (choreography: Yuri Burlaka and Vasily Medvedev), Bolshoi Ballet, 2011: as Diana, "Diana and Acteon"
The Sleeping Beauty (choreography: Yuri Grigorovich), Bolshoi Ballet, 2011: as the Canary, Red Riding Hood
Le Corsaire (choreography: Yuri Burlaka and Alexei Ratmansky), Bolshoi Ballet, 2012: pas d'esclaves
Raymonda (choreography: Yuri Grigorovich), Bolshoi Ballet, 2012: grand pas variation
La Bayadère (choreography: Yuri Grigorovich), Bolshoi Ballet, 2013: first variation, "Kingdom of the Shades"
Jewels (choreography: George Balanchine), Bolshoi Ballet, 2014: "Emeralds"
Marco Spada (choreography: Pierre Lacotte), Bolshoi Ballet, 2014: as the Bride
The Cage (choreography: Jerome Robbins), Bolshoi Ballet, 2017: as the Novice
Le Corsaire (choreography: Yuri Burlaka and Alexei Ratmansky), Bolshoi Ballet, 2017: pas d'esclaves
La Sylphide (choreography: Johan Kobborg), Bolshoi Ballet, 2018: Sylph

References

External links
Stashkevich's page on the website of the Bolshoi Theatre (English)

1984 births
Living people
Russian ballerinas
Moscow State Academy of Choreography alumni
Bolshoi Ballet principal dancers
Dancers from Saint Petersburg
21st-century Russian ballet dancers